There were 32 states of the United States with Amish population in 2022 that consists of at least one Amish settlement of Old or New Order Amish, excluding more modern Amish groups like e.g. the Beachy Amish. New Order Amish are seen as part of the Old Order Amish despite the name by most scholars.

The Amish have settled in as many as 32 US-states though about 2/3 are located in Pennsylvania, Ohio and Indiana. The largest Amish settlement is Lancaster County, Pennsylvania and adjacent counties followed by Holmes and adjoining counties in northeast Ohio, about 78 miles south of Cleveland. Third in size is the settlement in Elkhart, LaGrange and surrounding counties in northeastern Indiana which is geographically merging with the Nappanee settlement due to the growth of both settlements, which filled the gap between the two. According to Albrecht Powell, the Pennsylvania Amish has not always been the largest group of U.S. Amish as is commonly thought. 

The Amish population in the U.S. numbers more than 360,000 and is growing rapidly, due to large family size (seven children on average) and a church-member retention rate of approximately 80%."

Statistics of states 

The settlement in Pinecraft (Sarasota), Florida is very atypical and its population varies a lot according to the season.

Sources of the statistics
The data for 1992 are from "Amish Studies - The Young Center".

The data for 2000 are from a book published in 2001 (Donald Kraybill, The Riddle of Amish Culture) and from "Amish Studies – The Young Center".

The data for 2010 are from "Amish Studies - The Young Center". The 2010 census of Amish population was published in 2012, compiled by Elizabeth Cooksey, professor of sociology, and Cory Anderson, a graduate student in rural sociology, both at The Ohio State University. It was commissioned by the Association of Statisticians of American Religious Bodies for the 2010 U.S. Religion Census (published in 2012).

The data for 2022 comes from "Amish Studies – The Young Center".

The percentage of the state's population is from a 2021 estimate.

Largest settlements

Sources: 2020, 2021, and 2022.

Counties with the highest percentage
Data according to "2020 American Community Survey 5-Year Estimates". Percentage is calculated via the language statistics given by the ACS, which in the category "Language Spoken at Home", has the "other [than English or Spanish] Indo-European language" subcategory; in the following counties this is primarily Pennsylvania Dutch, the language of majority of the Amish people.

Amish settlements outside the US 
There are Amish settlements in four  Canadian provinces, Ontario, founded in the 1820s, Manitoba, founded in 2018, New Brunswick in 2015 and Prince Edward Island, in 2016. 

There was an Amish settlement in Honduras from about 1968 to 1978 but the settlement failed. 

In 2015 new settlements of New Order Amish were founded in Argentina and Bolivia.

References

Amish
Amish

Amish by state